Madison Brengle was the defending champion but lost in the second round to Mari Osaka.

Mariana Duque Mariño won the title after defeating Anhelina Kalinina 0–6, 6–1, 6–2 in the final.

Seeds

Draw

Finals

Top half

Bottom half

References
Main Draw

Boyd Tinsley Clay Court Classic - Singles